Georg Matthias Monn (born Johann Georg Mann 9 April 1717, Vienna – 3 October 1750, Vienna) was an Austrian composer, organist and music teacher whose works were fashioned in the transition from the Baroque to Classical period in music.

Together with Georg Christoph Wagenseil and Josef Starzer, Monn formed the Viennese Pre-Classical movement ("Wiener Vorklassik"), whose composers are nowadays mostly known only by their names. However, his successful introduction of the secondary theme in the symphony was an important element for the First Viennese School (Haydn, Mozart, Beethoven and Schubert)  that would come some fifty years later.

Biography 
Much less is known about Monn's life than about his musical ideas. Only his appointments as an organist are known, at first in Klosterneuburg near Vienna. Afterwards, he was appointed in the same position at Melk in Lower Austria and at the Karlskirche in Vienna's Wieden district. He died of tuberculosis aged 33.

His brother, Johann Christoph Mann (never Monn, 1726?-82), was also a composer whose works have sometimes been confused with Monn's. The reason for this is that most of Monn's compositions only survive in copies from the 1780s and could therefore also be the works of his younger brother. There is no absolute proof that the Johann Georg Mann is the same person as the Georg Matthias Monn who died in 1750. His role as pioneer of the symphony is a scholarly image, coined in the early 20th century, and could need some basic musicological reevaluation.

From Baroque to Classical
Together with Georg Christoph Wagenseil and other contemporaries such as Leopold Mozart and Josef Starzer, Monn could be said to represent a school of Austrian composers who had thoroughly studied the principles of counterpoint as practised by Johann Sebastian Bach and Johann Joseph Fux, but also effected a change from the formalistic, imposing and ornate Baroque style to the simpler, more graceful Galante music. Moreover, they renewed the sonata form by expanding the concepts of secondary theme and development. Later on, Michael and Joseph Haydn would develop these concepts to a much greater extent.

The catalog of works written by Matthias Monn contains sixteen symphonies, a score of quartets, sonatas, masses and compositions for violin and keyboard. A harpsichord concerto by Monn was "freely" arranged by Arnold Schoenberg as a cello concerto for Pablo Casals. The Monn/Schoenberg cello concerto in D major has been recorded by Yo-Yo Ma and many other cellists. Schoenberg also wrote "continuo realizations" for several works by Monn, including a cello concerto in G minor which was recorded by Jacqueline du Pré.

List of works
 Sixteen symphonies including
 Symphony in G major (also called Sinfonia in G major)
 Symphony in B major
 Symphony in B major
 Symphony in F major
 Six Quartets
 Concertos including
Concerto for Violin, Strings & Continuo In B Major
 Keyboard concerto in D major
 Cello concerto in D major (freely transcribed from Monn's harpsichord concerto by Arnold Schoenberg)
 Concerto for Cello (or Double Bass) in G Minor
 Concerto for Harpsichord, Strings & Continuo In G Minor (after Cello Concerto)
 Concerto for Harpsichord in G Minor 
 Concerto for Harpsichord, Strings & Continuo in D Major
 Concerto in A for Fortepiano and Strings
 Sonata in G minor
 Partitas, including
 Partita a tre no. 2 in G Minor
 Partita a tre no. 7 in D Major

Organ works:
 5 Preludia und Fugue
 Fugue in C
 Versetten for Organ

Notes

References

External links
Matthias Georg Monn in the Grove Concise Dictionary of Music, published in 1994 by Oxford University Press.

All the following links are in German.
 Matthias Georg Monn in der aeiou-Enzyklopädie

 Hörprobe aus Monn's Sinfonie in G

1717 births
1750 deaths
Austrian Classical-period composers
18th-century classical composers
18th-century Austrian male musicians
Austrian male classical composers